Keratosis follicularis-dwarfism-cerebral atrophy syndrome is a rare, presumably X-linked recessive genetic disorder characterized by keratosis follicularis, severe congenital proportionate dwarfism, and brain atrophy. Other less common findings include microcephaly, intellectual disability, alopecia, epilepsy, and inguinal hernias. It has only been described in 6 males from a 2-generation Mexican family.

References 

Rare syndromes
Rare genetic syndromes